The Empire City Derby was an American Thoroughbred horse race held annually from 1917 through 1933 at Empire City Race Track in Yonkers, New York. A race for three-year-old horses of either sex, the event was contested at a mile and one-eighth at inception until 1920 when it was set at what became known as the "Derby distance" of a mile and one-quarter. With the Brooklyn Derby at Belmont Park having changed its name to the Dwyer Stakes, the Empire City Derby was then the only Derby event in the Northeastern United States.

Historical notes
First run on July 21, 1917, the race was won by Rickety, a colt trained by future Hall of Fame inductee James G. Rowe Sr. Rickety was owned by Harry Payne Whitney, a leading horseman at the time and member of the prominent Whitney family who in 2018 was honored by the National Museum of Racing and Hall of Fame as one of the Pillars of the Turf. Whitney had won the 1915 Kentucky Derby with his Hall of Fame filly Regret and in addition to his 1917 Empire City Derby victory, Whitney would win the race again in 1920 and 1926.

The 1918 edition of the Empire City Derby was won by Jack Hare Jr. who earlier had won the second division of the Preakness Stakes in the only year in the history of that future U.S. Triple Crown race that it was run in two divisions.

Purchase, owned and trained by another future Hall of Fame inductee Sam Hildreth won the 1919 running. The beautiful chestnut son of Ormondale and the good racemare Cherryola was reported by noted racing historian Walter Vosburgh as a horse referred to as the "Adonis of the Turf".

In 1920, Harry Payne Whitney's Wildair had come into the race having easily won the prestigious Metropolitan Handicap at one mile. However, in the mile and an eighth Preakness Stakes he ran third and the "Derby distance" might be too far for the colt. However, Wildair won the mile and a quarter Empire City Derby by a length and a half for owner Harry Payne Whitney and his trainer James G. Rowe Sr. Wildair would go on to become a successful sire and especially so through his daughters as the damsire of several very good horses including Pot O'Luck and U.S. Racing Hall of Fame inductees Alsab and Bewitch.

Sam Hildreth won his second Empire City Derby in 1921 as the trainer of the Rancocas Stable star runner Grey Lag who would earn retrospective American Horse of the Year honors for 1921 and in 1957 be inducted into the U. S. Racing Hall of Fame.

For James Butler, owner of Empire City Race Track, the 1930 race was the most memorable of all for it was his very good colt Questionnaire that gave him the first of his two Derby wins.

Demise
Thoroughbred racing had been dealt a severe blow with the 1908 passage of the Hart–Agnew anti-betting legislation by the New York Legislature which led to a state-wide shutdown of racing in 1911 and 1912. Owners, whose horses of racing age had nowhere to go, began sending them, their trainers and their jockeys to race in England and France. Many horses ended their racing careers there and a number remained to become an important part of the European horse breeding industry. Thoroughbred Times reported that  more than 1,500 American horses were sent overseas between 1908 and 1913 and of them at least 24 were either past, present, or future Champions. A February 21, 1913 ruling by the New York Supreme Court, Appellate Division saw horse racing return in 1913.

The 1917 creation of the Empire City Derby symbolized the industry's recovery was gaining momentum but the Great Depression of the 1930s reversed much of the gains as breeding and other necessary monetary cutbacks resulted in fewer horses available to compete. As such, in 1932 the purse money for the Empire City Derby was cut by 40 percent and the following year it was cut further by nearly 50 percent. What would turn out to be the race's final running took place on July 15, 1933 and was won by Balios, a colt owned by the Phipps family's Wheatley Stable.

Records
Speed record:
 2:06.20 @ 1¼ miles: Ordinance (1924)

Most wins by a jockey:
 3 – Laverne Fator (1921, 1925, 1927)

Most wins by a trainer:
 3 – James G. Rowe Sr. (1917, 1920, 1926)
 3 – Sam Hildreth (1919, 1921, 1925)
 3 – James E. Fitzsimmons (1923, 1931, 1933)

Most wins by an owner:
 3 – Harry Payne Whitney (1917, 1920, 1926)

Winners

References

1917 establishments in New York (state)
1917 in sports in New York (state)
1934 disestablishments in New York (state)
1934 in sports in New York (state)
Defunct sports competitions in the United States
Empire City Race Track
Flat horse races for three-year-olds
Discontinued horse races in New York (state)
Recurring sporting events disestablished in 1934
Recurring sporting events established in 1917
Sports competitions in New York (state)